Grand Isle, also known as South Hero Island, is the largest island in Lake Champlain, Vermont, United States. The island comprises the two towns of Grand Isle and South Hero, Vermont. The total population as of the 2000 census was 3,651.

Lake islands of Vermont
Islands of Lake Champlain
Islands of Grand Isle County, Vermont
Grand Isle, Vermont
South Hero, Vermont